Santa Maria delle Grazie (St. Mary of Graces) may refer to:

 Our Lady of Graces, a devotion to the Virgin Mary in the Roman Catholic Church

Churches in Italy
 Santa Maria delle Grazie, Alcamo
 Santa Maria delle Grazie, Arezzo
 Santa Maria delle Grazie, Brescia
 Santa Maria delle Grazie, Este
 Santa Maria delle Grazie, Foce di Amelia
 Santa Maria delle Grazie, Loro Piceno
 Santa Maria delle Grazie, Milan
 Santa Maria delle Grazie, Montefiascone
 Santa Maria delle Grazie, Pesaro
 Santa Maria delle Grazie, Pistoia
 Santa Maria delle Grazie, Riccia
 Santa Maria delle Grazie, San Severino Marche
 Santa Maria delle Grazie, Scandriglia
 Santa Maria delle Grazie, Senigallia
 Santa Maria delle Grazie, Varallo
 Santa Maria delle Grazie a Capodimonte, Naples
 Santa Maria delle Grazie a Mondragone, Naples
 Santa Maria delle Grazie a Toledo, Naples
 Santa Maria delle Grazie a Via Trionfale, Rome
 Santa Maria delle Grazie alle Fornaci fuori Porta Cavalleggeri, Rome
 Santa Maria delle Grazie di Montevergine, Palermo
 Santa Maria delle Grazie Maggiore a Caponapoli, Naples
 Basilica of Santa Maria delle Grazie, Cortemaggiore

Other structures
 Santa Maria delle Grazie Tower, a watchtower in Xgħajra, Malta